Bishop Ramsey School is a coeducational Church of England secondary school and sixth form with academy status, located in the Ruislip area of the London Borough of Hillingdon, England. The school is named after Bishop Ian Ramsey.

History
Bishop Ramsey School was originally named Manor Secondary School which first opened in 1926. In 1977 it was renamed to 'Bishop Ramsey' when it merged with St. Martin's School in West Drayton. It was first located on at what used to be the Lower School site (Eastcote Road, Ruislip). The Lower School Site housed Years 7-9, and the Upper School Site housed Years 10-Sixth Form. In 2003, the school started construction to extend the Upper School to enable all students to enjoy the same range of facilities and opportunities. From April 2009, the school has been on the single site.

School Site 
The house groups are as follows:

  Rochester - Red 
  St. Albans - Blue 
  Manchester - Silver 
  Salisbury - Purple 
  Exeter - Green 
  York - Gold

They are all Cathedral Cities, and made to spell out RAMSEY. The site has four buildings - the Wedge Block, Z Block, Drama Barn and the Sports Hall.

Notable former pupils
Natasha Baker, Paralympic Gold medalist
Samantha Shannon, Author of the novel series The Bone Season

References

External links
Bishop Ramsey School official website

Academies in the London Borough of Hillingdon
Educational institutions established in 1926
Secondary schools in the London Borough of Hillingdon
1926 establishments in England
Church of England secondary schools in the Diocese of London